Zarabad may refer to:

Zarabad, Bashagard, Hormozgan Province
Zarabad, Minab, Hormozgan Province
Zarabad, Markazi
Zarabad, Qazvin
Zarabad, Sistan and Baluchestan
Zarabad, West Azerbaijan
Zarabad District, in Sistan and Baluchestan Province
 Zarabod, Gojal, Gilgit-Baltistan, Pakistan